Mikhail Gennadyevich Delyagin (born 16 March 1968)  is a modern Russian author, politician, and economist. A member of the Russian Academy of Natural Sciences, Delyagin took part in the experts team by the Supreme Soviet council from 1990 to 1991 and obtained an academic degree in economics in 1998. Director of the Problems issued by Globalization Institute (IPROG) and former chairman of the ideological council of the Rodina political party.

On 24 March 2022, the United States Treasury sanctioned him in response to the 2022 Russian invasion of Ukraine. On 29 March 2022, the Azerbaijani's General Prosecutor’s Office filed a criminal lawsuit against Delyagin on charges of “open calls to start an aggressive war,” “terrorism,” and “cultivation of hate and hostility on national, racial, social or religious grounds" in response to Delyagin threats against the country in TV. The prosecutor also asked Interpol for an international search warrant for him.

Major works
 The Renaissance ideology Идеология возрождения (2000);
 The World crisis. General globalization theory Мировой кризис. Общая теория глобализации (2003);
 Russia after Putin. Is the "Orange Revolution" really inevitable in Russia ? Россия после Путина. Неизбежна ли в России «оранжево-зелёная» революция? (2005).

See also
 Personal site
IPROG site
Maxim Kalashnikov : The battle for skies

References

Russian political writers
1968 births
Living people
Eighth convocation members of the State Duma (Russian Federation)
Russian individuals subject to the U.S. Department of the Treasury sanctions